CCV may stand for:
Cambodian Cultural Village (CCV), a theme park and museum in Siem Reap, Cambodia
Canberra Community Voters, a political party in the Australian Capital Territory
Card Code Verification, a security feature for credit or debit card transactions
Cave Conservancy of the Virginias, an American specialized land trust
Central California Valley Hydra (CCV Hydra), an American soccer team
Chekka Chivantha Vaanam (2018), a Tamil film directed by Mani Ratnam.
Christ's Church of the Valley, an Evangelical Christian megachurch in Peoria, Arizona
Chrysler CCV (Composite Concept Vehicle), a Chrysler concept car
Clathrin-Coated Vesicles, a part of mammalian and plant endocytic pathway
Colorado Conservation Voters, an environmental watchdog organization
Common couple violence, a form of domestic abuse
Community College of Vermont, an American educational institution
Control configured vehicle, an aircraft with Fly-by-wire flight controls
Cooperstown and Charlotte Valley Railroad, a heritage railroad in New York, USA
Country Club of Virginia, a private club near Richmond, Virginia, USA
YF-16 CCV, a variant of the F-16 Fighting Falcon
205 (number), CCV in Roman numerals
The year 205
Cameron Carter-Vickers
Cycloconverter, a type of motor controller
Crew Carrying Vehicle, the older version of CalFire's Emergency Crew Transport (ECT)